Yabusaki (written: 薮崎 or 八武崎) is a Japanese surname. Notable people with the surname include:

, better known as Aoi Yūki, Japanese voice actress, actress and singer
, Japanese footballer

Japanese-language surnames